The 1972 SCCA L&M Continental 5000 Championship was the Sports Car Club of America's sixth annual professional open-wheel auto racing series. It was open to Formula 5000 cars, these being Formula SCCA Class A open-wheel, single-seat cars with 5000cc restricted design engines or 3000cc unrestricted design engines. The championship was won by New Zealand driver Graham McRae.

Race schedule
The championship was contested over eight races with two heats per race.

Points system
Championship points were awarded to drivers on a 20-15-12-10-8-6-4-3-2-1 basis for the first ten places in each race, those places having been determined from the results of the two heats. Total points for each driver were based on the best six finishes.

Championship standings

References

Further reading
 F David Stone, Continental Championship - Formula 5000 comes of age, Motor Racing Year, 1973 Edition, pages 91 to 93

External links
 Old Racing Cars Formula 5000 page

SCCA Continental Championship
Formula 5000
LandM Championship